Port Entropy is a studio album by Shugo Tokumaru. It was originally released via P-Vine Records on April 21, 2010 in Japan. It peaked at number 33 on the Oricon Albums Chart.

Critical reception
At Metacritic, which assigns a weighted average score out of 100 to reviews from mainstream critics, Port Entropy received an average score of 71% based on 13 reviews, indicating "generally favorable reviews".

Adam Kivel of Consequence of Sound gave the album a grade of B, saying, "It's a wonderful record of a musician and songwriter in his prime, but one that requires a willingness to go on a ride, with an open mind and a willingness to have some fun." Mehan Jayasuriya of PopMatters gave the album 6 stars out of 10, saying, "While Port Entropy contains some of Tokumaru's most accomplished compositions yet, on the whole, it's a bit too monochrome for its own good."

Track listing

Charts

Release history

References

External links
 

2010 albums
Shugo Tokumaru albums
P-Vine Records albums
Polyvinyl Record Co. albums